M. nepalensis may refer to:

 Mahonia nepalensis, an evergreen shrub
 Mallinella nepalensis, an ant spider
 Mastax nepalensis, a ground beetle
 Meconopsis nepalensis, a plant containing beta-Carbolines
 Medasina nepalensis, an Asian moth
 Melittia nepalensis, a clearwing moth
 Microzargus nepalensis, a ground beetle
 Mimocolliuris nepalensis, a ground beetle
 Monocercops nepalensis, a Nepalese moth
 Mordellistena nepalensis, a tumbling flower beetle
 Musa nepalensis, a plant native to Asia